Clearwater Lake campground may refer to campgrounds at:

Wells Gray Provincial Park (section Campgrounds)
Clearwater Lake (British Columbia)
Clearwater Lake Recreation Area, Florida